The , also known as the Himeji Tegarayama Green House, is a botanical garden located within a greenhouse in Tegarayama Central Park at 93 Tegara, Himeji, Hyogo, Japan.

See also 
 List of botanical gardens in Japan

References 

 Tegarayama Botanical Garden (Japanese)
 Bekkoame article
 BGCI entry

Buildings and structures in Himeji
Tourist attractions in Himeji
Botanical gardens in Japan
Gardens in Hyōgo Prefecture
Greenhouses in Japan